Expert shopping is the practice of finding an authority on a given subject whose professional opinion is skewed toward the answer that the searching party already prefers. This is commonplace in the news media, politics, and business, though can be found in all walks of life.

Another well-known use is in lawsuits, when an expert witness can be paid to testify in favor of one side of the case. In this case, the expert witnesses on each side may have totally different opinions.
Evidence law